There were two general elections held in the United Kingdom in 1910:

January 1910 United Kingdom general election
December 1910 United Kingdom general election